Carmiña Londoño is a Deputy Division Director at the National Science Foundation. She previously spent 13 years at the National Institute of Standards and Technology, where she led the Global Standards and Information Group. Londoño spent two terms on the Board of Directors of SPIE, and won their Director's Award in 2019.

Early life and education 
Londoño was born in Colombia. She moved to the United States at the age of 13, and grew up in Lowell, Massachusetts. Her parents were passionate about her education, and encouraged her and her sisters to become engineers. During high school Londoño competed in science fairs. She visited the Kennedy Space Center as a child, and became interested in space physics. She eventually studied physics at the University of Massachusetts Lowell. During her summer holidays she worked at Itek in Lexington, Massachusetts. Her work included ultra-lightweight mirrors and trying to mitigate the degradation of image quality arising from intercellular deflections. She earned her Master's degree in Optics at the University of Arizona in 1982. Her Master's dissertation considered techniques to measure the radius of curvature.

Research and career 
After completing her MS degree at the Optical Sciences Center at the University of Arizona, Londoño returned to Massachusetts, where she joined the Avco-Everett Research Laboratory to work with Ralph Berggren on the lens design and building of diffraction limited optical resonators for high-energy excimer lasers for the Strategic Defense Initiative. After finishing her work at Avco, Londoño joined the Polaroid Corporation to work with Peter Clark and William Plummer on the optical design and testing of novel optical systems for medical applications, consumer products (cameras, CD players) and large quantity molded optical elements for original equipment manufacturers. She co-designed the optics for a medical printer that wrote digital half-tone images with four multi-mode diode lasers on a Polaroid proprietary and unique high-resolution binary film for ultrasound and x-ray applications. While at Polaroid under the guidance of William Plummer, Londoño completed a PhD at the Tufts University Electro-Optics Technology Center. Her research focused on the mathematical modeling, design and fabrication of diffractive optical elements for optical athermalization and achromatization. She received a U.S. patent  for this work and Polaroid subsequently incorporated this technology in a consumer camera.

In 1994 Londoño was selected as a Congressional Science Fellow, supported by the American Institute of Physics. She worked as a technical adviser for the United States House Committee on Science, Space, and Technology, working for James Turner. She joined the National Institute of Standards and Technology in 1995, where she spent thirteen years. She was the Group Leader for the Global Standards and Information Group which provided technical & policy support for standards & metrology to the private sector and to U.S. government agencies. Her group had responsibility for the Standards in Trade Workshop Program, that trained over 2,000 foreign participants in US metrology and standardization. Londoño was the official NIST representative to the International Standardization Organization on Developing Country Matters addressing the metrology and standardization needs of developing countries.

In 2008 Londoño joined the National Science Foundation as a Program Director in the NSF Office of International Science and Engineering having programmatic responsibility for a multidisciplinary set of scientific collaborations with South America. In 2011, she was transferred to the Division of Materials Research to co-manage the Materials World Network Program. In 2012, she joined the Engineering Research Centers, which funds interdisciplinary, multi-institutional teams from academia, industry, and government in partnership to produce transformational engineered systems with strong societal impact along with engineering graduates who are adept at innovation and leadership in the global economy. As of 2019 she serves as the Deputy Division Director of the Electrical, Communications and Cyber Systems Division ECCS  in the NSF Engineering Directorate.

Academic service 
Londoño is a Fellow of the SPIE, and spent two terms serving on their Board of Directors. She co-founded the Women in Optics Committee, and was featured in their 2005 Women in Optics planner. In 2019 she was awarded the SPIE Directors' Award for her outstanding commitment to the society. In 2017, the University of Massachusetts Lowell awarded her the Physics Alumnus of the Year Award.

She is passionate about improving access to optics and physics careers. She has volunteered through an international volunteer organization called Outreach360, where she visited the Dominican Republic and Nicaragua where she conducted optics and science camps. These programs are intended to enhance the education of underserved children in Latin America.

Personal life 
Carmiña Londoño is married to Joseph Kopanski, Group Leader of the Nanoscale Imaging Group at the National Institute of Standards and Technology. She has one daughter, Lillian Lahti.

References 

Living people
20th-century Colombian women scientists
People from Lowell, Massachusetts
Fellows of SPIE
Year of birth missing (living people)
Women in optics